Baldwin is an unincorporated community in Baltimore County, Maryland, United States. The USPS has assigned Baldwin the ZIP Code 21013.  Until 1958, this community was served by the Maryland and Pennsylvania Railroad at milepost 18.4. Hidden Valley Farm was listed on the National Register of Historic Places in 1983.

References

Unincorporated communities in Baltimore County, Maryland
Unincorporated communities in Maryland